The Interstate Aviation Committee (IAC) is an executive body of the  Civil Aviation and Airspace Use Council of the Commonwealth of Independent States (CIS) and was formed in 1991 according to the Civil Aviation and Airspace Use Multilateral Agreement, signed on 25 December 1991.

History
In the Soviet Union, the State Supervisory Commission for Flight Safety (Gosavianadzor), under the Council of Ministers, was the predecessor of the IAC. The Gosavianadzor conducted aircraft accident and incident investigations. until the IAC was established in Minsk on 25 December 1991.

The IAC has been accredited by ICAO as an intergovernmental organisation which may be invited to attend suitable ICAO meetings (officially, ICAO does not classify these as observers).

The Aviation Accident Investigation Commission of the IAC cooperates with the Federal Air Transport Agency in investigations of aviation accidents. One publicly known and controversial IAC investigation was the 2010 plane crash that killed Polish president Lech Kaczyński.

Governance
The committee is head-quartered in Yakimanka District, Central Administrative Okrug, Moscow, Russia. Since 1991, Tatiana Anodina has been the chairperson of the committee. There was press speculation regarding Anodina's conflict of interest in certifying aircraft with respect to Transaero's market position.

Participating states

Current
, the following countries are named by the IAC as the Treaty participants:
Azerbaijan
Armenia
Belarus
Kazakhstan
Kyrgyzstan
Moldova
In 1999 Government of Moldova announced its intention to reduce or end participation in the Civil Aviation and Airspace Use Multilateral Agreement. The IAC's official web site still names Moldova among participating states
Russia (partially, in aviation accidents investigation domain)
Tajikistan
Turkmenistan
Uzbekistan

Former
Georgia
Despite the fact that Georgia withdrew from the Commonwealth of Independent States,  Georgian authorities may still cooperate with the IAC.
Ukraine
Ukraine has its own independent civil aviation and accidents investigation agencies. Ukraine's participation was based on two agreements concluded within the CIS - a presidential decree.

See also
 Aviation accidents and incidents

References

External links
 Interstate Aviation Committee
 Interstate Aviation Committee 
 
  

Commonwealth of Independent States
Organizations investigating aviation accidents and incidents
Aviation organizations based in Russia
1991 establishments in Russia
Organizations established in 1991